Melville is an unincorporated area in the Canadian province of Nova Scotia, located in  Pictou County.  It is on Nova Scotia Trunk 6 between the communities of River John, Cape John and Toney River. It is a rural area on the Northumberland Strait to the east of Cape John. The nearest village is River John, some 5 km south, and it is there that postal, telephone and fire services are located. The nearest town is Pictou some 29 km to the east.

There is a small harbour at Skinners Cove, comprising short breakwaters and wharves either side of a narrow channel. It is used mainly by the fishing industry and a few recreational boats. Recent improvements to the harbour were funded by the Government of Canada.

References

Communities in Pictou County
General Service Areas in Nova Scotia